Siffleur (French, 'whistler') may refer to:

 Siffleur (professional whistler), 
 Siffleur River, rising in the Canadian Rockies
 Siffleur Falls
 Siffleur Mountain, in Alberta, Canada
 Siffleur Wilderness Area

See also
Rufous-throated solitaire, known in Dominica as siffleur montagne
Siffleuse (1890–1908), a British Thoroughbred racehorse 
"Siffler sur la colline" ('Whistle on the hill') is a 1968 song by Joe Dassin